The 2010 Indonesian Women's Football Tournament season was the third edition of Indonesian Women's Football Tournament (IWFT), a fully professional football competition for women in the country. The competition began on 4 October 2010 and ended on 9 October 2010.

Format 
This competition has adopted a single host tournament system, for which Jakarta was chosen as the host. It was contested only by seven out of thirty three provincial football associations in Indonesia.

Each qualified team must include a minimum of eight players under the age of sixteen. It is aimed to develop young female players that have potentials to become the future squad of the Indonesia women's national football team.

The competition began with a group stage using a single round system. Seven teams were divided into two groups. Group A consisted of three teams, while group B four teams. The top two teams from each group advanced to the semifinals, which commences the knock-out tournament. The two winners of the semi-finals then competed for the final match to determine the champion and runner-up. While, the losers played for the third and fourth place.

Qualified teams 
Women football teams from the following provinces have participated in this edition:
North Sumatra, Banten, West Java, Papua, Jakarta, Babel, and Yogyakarta.
The other provinces were unable to send their teams due to a lack of preparation.

Group stage

Group A

Fixtures and results

Group B

Fixtures and results

Knockout phase

Semifinals

Third place

Final

Honors

Champions

Top scorers

Best players

Top scorers 

2010
Indo
Women